

Highest-grossing films

Highest-grossing film per year

List of films 

 2020 in film
 2021 in film
 2022 in film
 2023 in film

References

See also

Film, History of film, Lists of films
List of animated feature films of the 2020s
Impact of the COVID-19 pandemic on cinema

 
Films by decade
Film by decade